The Damascus International Film Festival is a biannual November film festival hosted by the government of Syria since 1979. The festival was established by the late Syrian film director Muhammad Shahin. It alternates with the Carthage Film Festival. Up to 1999, the festival's competition focused on films from Arab countries, Latin America and Asia. Since 2001 the festival has an international focus.

Major Award Winners

References

External links
Damascus International Film Festival official website

 
Film festivals in Syria
1979 establishments in Syria
Film festivals established in 1979
Biennial events
Autumn events in Syria